Kingsville is an inner-city suburb in Melbourne, Victoria, Australia,  west of Melbourne's Central Business District, located within the City of Maribyrnong local government area.

Kingsville is a small suburb nestled primarily between West Footscray and Yarraville, and is often considered to be a part of one or the other. The suburb forms a right-angled triangle, bounded in the east by Williamstown Road, in the south by Somerville Road, with Geelong Road as the hypotenuse.

History

Kingsville was the original name for the entire West Yarraville region. This region was later renamed either Yarraville (south of Somerville Road) or West Footscray (north of Somerville Road), with South Kingsville retaining its original name. In the late 1990s the original name of Kingsville returned to the "wedge" of West Footscray with its present boundaries.

Kingsville Post Office opened on 1 January 1915.

Education

Kingsville Primary School and its attached kindergarten is located in Yarraville. The nearby Kingsville Kindergarten is actually in West Footscray, as is the Corpus Christi Catholic School.

See also
 City of Footscray – Kingsville was previously within this former local government area.

References

Suburbs of Melbourne
Suburbs of the City of Maribyrnong